Vasilevo is a village in North Macedonia. It is a seat of the Vasilevo municipality.

Demographics
As of the 2021 census, Vasilevo had 2,175 residents with the following ethnic composition:
Macedonians 1,450
Turks 352
Persons for whom data are taken from administrative sources 314
Others 38
Roma 21

According to the 2002 census, the village had a total of 2,174 inhabitants. Ethnic groups in the village include:
Macedonians 1,819
Turks 349
Others 6

Sports
Local football club FK Vasilevo plays in the Macedonian Third League (Southeast Division).

References

Villages in Vasilevo Municipality